Rotes Rathaus is a subway station in Berlin's Mitte district. It is part of the extension of the U5 from Alexanderplatz to Brandenburger Tor, construction of which began with a turf-cutting ceremony in 2010. The station and the line opened simultaneously on 4 December 2020.

Planning

The station opened in December 2020. The 100-meter-long station was built under Rathausstraße directly in front of Rotes Rathaus (Berlin city hall). The station has a gross floor area of 8000 m2. The architect is Oliver Collignon.

The station has two levels: On the upper level the U5 line runs with two outside platforms and on the lower level a train storage area with four tracks was built to allow later conversion to a two track platform if either the U3 or U10 to Potsdamer Platz projects are realized.

Pedestrian access is possible from both ends: Spandauer Straße north of Rathausstraße in the west, and two more on Jüdenstraße in the east. Two elevators connect to the platform on the eastern end.

The station has been built using cut and cover construction. Following construction of the 32 meter deep slurry walls, it was topped with an HDI sole lid.

In the west the station joins the excavation pit used for the tunnel boring machine which will contains track switching and a weir chamber under the Spree river. All equipment for the operation, such as power, telecommunication and air conditioning systems is installed in the underground station building.

Until 31 August 2016 the station had the working title Berliner Rathaus (Berlin city hall), however this was officially changed on 1 September 2016 to Rotes Rathaus (red (brick) city hall).

Construction
Archaeological excavations began in 2009 in the area of the starting excavation pit and eventual station which led to the creation of the Berlin Sculpture Fund. At the same time extensive line relocations were needed in the area which lasted until the end of 2011.

The start of station construction was further delayed as archaeologists unexpectedly found well-preserved remains of the medieval Altes Rathaus in front of the Rotes Rathaus during excavations. As a result, the station was rescheduled and an exit relocated so parts of these relics remain preserved and may possibly be presented by an "archaeological window". However, for technical and financial reasons this window will remain initially closed.

While the tunnel sections were constructed in spring of 2012, actual station construction began in early 2013 with a budget of 62 M Euro for the station shell.

The topping-out ceremony was celebrated on September 7, 2016, and hosted approximately 3,000 interested visitors.

See also
Rotes Rathaus the station's namesake and the colloquial name for Berlin city hall.

References

External links

 

U5 (Berlin U-Bahn) stations
Rotes Rathaus (U-Bahnhof)
Railway stations in Berlin
2020 establishments in Germany
Railway stations in Germany opened in 2020